Man Called Amen (also known as They Called Him Amen and Therefore It Is) is a 1972 Italian Spaghetti Western comedy film directed by Alfio Caltabiano. The film was a box office success and generated an immediate sequel, They Still Call Me Amen (Mamma mia è arrivato così sia).

Cast 

 Luc Merenda: Amen 
 Sydne Rome: Dorothy
 Alfio Caltabiano: Reverend Smith 
 Míla Beran: Grandpa
 Tano Cimarosa: Chako
 Renato Cestiè:  John 
 Dante Maggio: Professor
 Furio Meniconi: Sheriff

References

External links

1972 films
Spaghetti Western films
1970s Western (genre) comedy films
Films with screenplays by Dario Argento
1972 comedy films
1970s Italian films